Catocala patala is a moth in the family Erebidae first described by Felder and Rogenhofer in 1874. It is found in northern India, China, Korea and Japan (Honshu, Shikoku, Kyushu, Tsushima).

The hindwings are yellow, heavily marked with a black band near the margin and an inner black band forming a U shape.

References

patala
Moths described in 1874
Moths of Asia